Lucky Dlepu (born 7 November 1999) is a South African rugby union player for the  in the United Rugby Championship and the  in the Currie Cup. His regular position is scrum-half.

Dlepu was named in the  side for the 2022 Currie Cup Premier Division.

References

South African rugby union players
Living people
Rugby union scrum-halves
Sharks (rugby union) players
Sharks (Currie Cup) players
Pumas (Currie Cup) players
1999 births